The 1948 All-American Girls Professional Baseball League season marked the sixth season of the circuit. The AAGPBL grew to an all-time peak of ten teams in that season, representing Eastern and Western zones, just in the first year the circuit shifted to strictly overhand pitching. Other modifications occurred during 1948. The ball was decreased in size from 11½ inches to 10⅜ inches, while the base paths were lengthened to 72 feet and the pitching distance increased to 50 feet.

The Chicago Colleens and the Springfield Sallies were added to the previous roster that included the Kenosha Comets, Fort Wayne Daisies, Grand Rapids Chicks, Muskegon Lassies, Peoria Redwings, Racine Belles, Rockford Peaches and South Bend Blue Sox. The Chicago, Fort Wayne, Grand Rapids, Muskegon and South Bend teams were aligned in the East Division, while Kenosha, Peoria, Racine, Rockford and Springfield played in the Western Division. The number of games in the schedule increased from 112 to 126.

For the second consecutive year the AAGPBL spring training camp was held in Havana, Cuba. as part of a plan to create an International League of Girls Baseball. Around two hundred girls made the trip. Among them, players represented 27 different states in the United States and many provinces of Canada, while several Cuban players entered the league as a result of holding spring training there the year before. A total of 21 players had been in the league since its foundation in 1943.

The fact of two divisions resulted in the Shaughnessy system adding another round of playoffs to decide the championship between eight teams. The first round faced the top teams of each division in a best-of-three series, with the first place team playing against the third place team and the second place team against the fourth place team. The winners competed in a best-of-five divisional first round, with the first place team facing the third place team and the second place team against the fourth place team. The sectional champions then advanced to the third round and faced in the best-of-seven Championship Series.

Pitchers continued to dominate the league in that season even though many of them could not adapt to the new pitching style. Grand Rapids' Alice Haylett led all pitchers with a 0.77 earned run average, while 20 averaged at least a 1.99 mark. In addition, Haylett and Racine's Eleanor Dapkus hurled 10 shutouts a piece. The only .300 hitter was Kenosha's Audrey Wagner (.312), who also led the circuit in hits (130) and total bases (186).  At the end of the season Wagner was honored with the AAGPBL Player of the Year Award.

The Grand Rapids and Racine teams won their respective division. In the first round, Grand Rapids, Fort Wayne, Racine and Rockford swept South Bend, Muskegon, Peoria and Kenosha, respectively. In the divisional playoffs, Fort Wayne swept Grand Rapids and Rockford did the same with Racine. Then, Rockford jumped out to a three-game lead in the final series and defeated Fort Wayne four games to one. Helen Nicol was credited with four of the 10 playoff wins of Rockford, including two in the finals, while Lois Florreich and Margaret Holgerson took three a piece. In Game 1 of the first round, Florreich pitched the first no-hitter in series history, and Holgerson threw a second no-hitter in Game 3 to set an all-time record for the most playoff no-hitters. Another highlight came in the first round, when South Bend's Jean Faut outdueled Haylett of Grand Rapids, 3–2, in 20 innings, in what would be the longest game in AAGPBL playoff history.

The league drew almost a million fans for the second consecutive season, although the Chicago and Springfield franchises failed to reach the attendance required. Then, the Colleens and the Sallies were turned into player development teams that toured and played exhibition games to recruit and train new players. The tour started in Chicago and ended up in Canada, including stops in Yankee Stadium and Griffith Stadium.

Standings

Eastern Division

Western Division

Postseason

Batting statistics

Pitching statistics

All-Star Game

See also
1948 Major League Baseball season

Sources

External links
AAGPBL Official Website
AAGPBL Records
Baseball Historian files
The Diamond Angle profiles and interviews
SABR Projects – Jim Sargent articles
YouTube videos

All-American Girls Professional Baseball League seasons
1940s in women's baseball
1948 in baseball
All